Archduke Ferdinand Karl Joseph of Austria-Este (25 April 1781 – 5 November 1850) was the third son of Archduke Ferdinand of Austria-Este and of his wife Princess Maria Beatrice Ricciarda d'Este, last member and heiress of the House of Este.  For much of the Napoleonic Wars he was in command of the Austrian army.

Ferdinand was born at Milan. He attended the military academy in Wiener Neustadt before embarking on a military career. In 1805 in the war of the Third Coalition against France, Ferdinand was commander-in-chief of the Austrian forces with General Karl Freiherr Mack von Leiberich as his quartermaster general.  In October his army was surrounded at Ulm. General Mack surrendered, but Ferdinand managed to escape with 2000 cavalry to Bohemia. There he took command of the Austrian troops and raised the local militia.  With a total of 9,000 men he set out for Iglau to distract attention from the Coalition's movements. He succeeded in holding the Bavarian division of Prince Karl Philipp von Wrede in Iglau thereby and preventing it from joining the Battle of Austerlitz.

In 1809 in the war of the Fifth Coalition against France, Ferdinand commanded an Austrian army of 36,000 men. In April he invaded the Duchy of Warsaw hoping to encourage a local uprising against Napoleon (see Polish–Austrian War). But the Poles rallied to Prince Józef Antoni Poniatowski.  Ferdinand was defeated at the Battle of Raszyn, but managed to occupy Warsaw. In June, however, Ferdinand was compelled to withdraw from Warsaw, and to give up Kraków and Galicia as well.

In 1815 in the war of the Seventh Coalition against France, Ferdinand commanded two divisions of the Austrian Reserve.  The following year he was appointed military commander in Hungary.

In 1830 Ferdinand was appointed military and civil governor of Galicia, taking up residence in Lviv.  After the Revolution of 1848 he lived mostly in Italy.

Ferdinand never married.  In 1850 he died at Schloss Ebenzweier in Altmünster near Gmunden, Austria.

Honours

Ancestry

References 

1781 births
1850 deaths
Nobility from Milan
Austria-Este
Modenese princes
Austrian generals
Austrian Empire commanders of the Napoleonic Wars
Austrian princes
Generals of the Holy Roman Empire
Governors of the Kingdom of Galicia and Lodomeria
Knights of the Golden Fleece of Austria
Knights Cross of the Military Order of Maria Theresa
Grand Crosses of the Order of Saint Stephen of Hungary
Recipients of the Order of the White Eagle (Russia)
Recipients of the Order of St. Anna, 1st class
Military personnel from Milan
Recipients of the Order of the White Eagle (Poland)
Theresian Military Academy alumni
Burials at the Imperial Crypt
Sons of monarchs